Hymenopappus biennis, the biennial woollywhite, is a North American species of flowering plant in the daisy family. It has been found in New Mexico and western Texas.

It produces 20-40 flower heads per stem, each head with 8 white ray flowers surrounding 32–50 yellow disc flowers.

References

External links
Photo of herbarium specimen at Missouri Garden, collected in Guadalupe Mountains of Texas in 1931, isotype of Hymenopappus biennis

biennis
Endemic flora of the United States
Flora of New Mexico
Flora of Texas
Guadalupe Mountains National Park
Plants described in 1956
Flora without expected TNC conservation status